Halysidota pearsoni is a moth of the family Erebidae. It was described by Watson in 1980. It is found in southern Brazil (Santa Catarina, Rio Grande do Sul, Parana, Rio de Janeiro, São Paulo, Espirito Santo) and Paraguay.

References

Halysidota
Moths described in 1980